Claude Carmona (born 3 January 1964) is a French gymnast. He competed in eight events at the 1988 Summer Olympics.

References

External links
 

1964 births
Living people
French male artistic gymnasts
Olympic gymnasts of France
Gymnasts at the 1988 Summer Olympics
People from Auch
Sportspeople from Gers